Roberto Di Donna (born 8 September 1968 in Rome) is an Italian sport shooter and Olympic champion. He received a gold medal in 10 metre air pistol at the 1996 Summer Olympics in Atlanta.

Achievements

See also
World Cup Multi-Medalists

References

External links
 

1968 births
Living people
Italian male sport shooters
ISSF pistol shooters
Olympic shooters of Italy
Olympic gold medalists for Italy
Olympic bronze medalists for Italy
Shooters at the 1988 Summer Olympics
Shooters at the 1992 Summer Olympics
Shooters at the 1996 Summer Olympics
Shooters at the 2000 Summer Olympics
Olympic medalists in shooting
Shooters of Fiamme Gialle
Medalists at the 1996 Summer Olympics